Easy Wanderlings is an independent band based in Pune, India, formed in 2015. The eight-member group, whose music displays ambient soul, pop and folk influences, has released one album and an EP with two tracks since its inception.

Career 
Easy Wanderlings produced their debut album "As Written in the Stars" through crowdfunding and released it in August 2017. The album contained eight tracks and featured various guest artists. Until the release, the core band members kept their individual identities hidden from public domain.

In September 2019, they launched a two-track concept EP titled "My Place to You."

Notable performances and recognition 
Easy Wanderlings have been returning performers at annual multi-stage music festival NH7 Weekender in Pune, India, taking the stage for the first time in 2016 and again in 2017 and 2019. They also performed at music festival VH1 Supersonic 2018, which was headlined by many international artists, including Major Lazer, Marshmello, and Sean Paul.

The band was also invited and scheduled to perform at the SXSW Music Festival 2020 in Austin, Texas, USA. However, the event was canceled due to health concerns surrounding the Coronavirus pandemic.

Malay Vadalkar, band member and audio engineer, won the Indian Recording Arts Academy (IRAA) Award for Independent Song Recording for their song "Enjoy it While it Lasts" in 2018.

Members 
 Sanyanth Naroth - Composer, lyricist, rhythm guitar, lead vocals
 Malay Vadalkar - Bass guitar, backing vocals
 Pratika Gopinath - Lead vocals, percussion
 Nitin M. Krishna - Keyboard
 Sharad Rao - Guitar, lead vocals
 Shardul Bapat - Violin
 Siya Ragade - Flute
 Abraham Zachariah - Drums, percussion

Discography

Albums

As Written in the Stars (2017) 
Tracks:
 Ode to a Bristlecone
 Here's to You
 Summer is Away
 I for Little Things
 Enjoy It While It Lasts
 Dream to Keep Us Going
 Faces
 Going Easy

EPs

My Place to You (2019) 
Tracks:
 Beneath the Fireworks
 Madeline

References 

Indian musical groups
2015 establishments in Maharashtra
Musical groups established in 2015